The Bridgewater Bandits, also called the Boston Bandits, are a junior ice hockey organization from Bridgewater, Massachusetts, in the United States, with teams playing in the United States Premier Hockey League. The organization plays home games at the Bridgewater Ice Arena.

History
The Boston Bandits organization had a team in the Tier III Eastern Junior Hockey League (EJHL) from 1996 until its dissolution in 2013. The Bandits would then join the Atlantic Junior Hockey League which would reorganize and become the Eastern Hockey League (EHL) for the 2013–14 season.

The Bandits organization also fields teams in the lower level USPHL Premier Division, as well as youth hockey select teams at the Bantam, Peewee, and Squirt and various other levels. The Premier team originally played in the Empire Junior B Hockey League until 2013 and then the Metropolitan Junior Hockey League (MetJHL) from 2013 to 2015 at which point the EHL added the Elite Division and the former EHL teams were all promoted to the Premier Division. The MetJHL team then joined the EHL-Elite Division.

In 2017, the Bandits' organization left the EHL for the United States Premier Hockey League (USPHL). The USPHL was planning to launch the Tier II level league, which became the National Collegiate Development Conference (NCDC), for the 2017–18 season. However, the USPHL was denied the Tier II status by USA Hockey and the junior league went independent. The top level Bandits team joined the NCDC and the developmental team joined the Premier Division.

The Bandits sold their NCDC franchise to the Philadelphia Hockey Club for the 2020–21 season. The organization was then sold to Scott Harlow in December 2019 and the organization reverted to the Bridgewater Bandits identity beginning with the 2020–21 season.

Season-by-season records

References

External links
 Bandits website

Ice hockey teams in Massachusetts
Sports in Plymouth County, Massachusetts
Bridgewater, Massachusetts
1996 establishments in Massachusetts
Ice hockey clubs established in 1996